Pool A of the 2018 Fed Cup Americas Zone Group I was one of two pools in the Americas zone of the 2018 Fed Cup. Three teams competed in a round robin competition, with the top team and the bottom team proceeding to their respective sections of the play-offs: the top team played for advancement to the World Group II Play-offs, while the bottom team faced potential relegation to Group II.

Standings 

Standings are determined by: 1. number of wins; 2. number of matches; 3. in two-team ties, head-to-head records; 4. in three-team ties, (a) percentage of sets won (head-to-head records if two teams remain tied), then (b) percentage of games won (head-to-head records if two teams remain tied), then (c) Fed Cup rankings.

Round-robin

Paraguay vs. Colombia

Paraguay vs. Chile

Chile vs. Colombia

References

External links 
 Fed Cup website

2018 Fed Cup Americas Zone